Testify For My Victims is sixth full-length album by the Swedish band Carnal Forge.

Track listing 

"Testify for My Victims" - 4:03
"Burning Eden" - 4:15
"Numb (The Dead)" - 2:52
"Godsend Gods End" - 4:53
"End Game" - 4:13
"Questions Pertaining the Ownership of My Mind" - 4:14
"Freedom by Mutilation" - 3:48
"Subhuman" - 3:49
"No Longer Bleeding" - 4:17
"Biological Waste Matter" - 3:35
"Lost Legion" - 3:01
"Ante Mori" - 5:13

Line-up
 Jens C. Mortensen - Vocals
 Stefan Westerberg - Drums
 Jari Kuusisto - Guitar
 Petri Kuusisto - Guitar
 Lars Lindén - Bass

Notes

2007 albums